Benik Amirian (born 1929) was an Iranian alpine skier. He competed in three events at the 1956 Winter Olympics.

References

External links

1929 births
Possibly living people
Iranian male alpine skiers
Olympic alpine skiers of Iran
Alpine skiers at the 1956 Winter Olympics
Place of birth missing (living people)